Transkribus is a platform for the text recognition, image analysis and structure recognition of historical documents.

The platform was created in the context of the two EU projects tranScriptorium (2013–2015) and READ (Recognition and Enrichment of Archival Documents – 2016–2019). It was developed by the University of Innsbruck. Since July 1, 2019 the platform has been directed and further developed by the READ-COOP.

The platform integrates tools developed by research groups throughout Europe, including the Pattern Recognition and Human Language Technology (PRHLT) group of the  Technical University of Valencia and the Computational Intelligence Technology Lab (CITlab) group of University of Rostock.

References

External links
 READ-COOP
 Website Transkribus
 Deutschsprachige Benutzeranleitung für die Transkribus-Plattform
 Github Repository
 Marc Rothballer: Transkribus – Erfahrungsbericht zu maschinellem Lernen und Handwritten Text Recognition in der Heimat- und Familienforschung, Besprechung der Software vom 26. Juni 2020 im Archivalia-Blog

Optical character recognition
 
Applications of artificial intelligence
Machine learning task